An election is a political process. 

Election may also refer to:

 Election (novel), by Tom Perrotta
 Election (1999 film), an American comedy starring Reese Witherspoon and Matthew Broderick
 Election (2005 film), a Hong Kong action thriller directed by Johnnie To
 Election (2013 film), an Indian action drama film directed by Om Prakash Rao
 Election (TV series)
 Election (Christianity), a theological term
 Predestination, a religious concept
 Conditional election
 Unconditional election
 "Election" (The Vicar of Dibley), first-series episode of the TV series The Vicar of Dibley
 Leader election, a concept in distributed computing
 The Election, a Hong Kong television series
 Election (horse)

See also
-elect
Choice (disambiguation)